Leptysmini is a tribe of spur-throat toothpick grasshoppers in the family Acrididae. There are about 9 genera and more than 30 described species in Leptysmini, found in North, Central, and South America.

Genera
These nine genera belong to the tribe Leptysmini:
 Belosacris Rehn & Eades, 1961
 Carbonellacris Roberts, 1977
 Columbacris Bruner, 1911
 Cylindrotettix Bruner, 1906
 Leptysma Stål, 1873
 Leptysmina Giglio-Tos, 1894
 Seabratettix Roberts, 1980
 Stenacris Walker, 1870
 Tucayaca Bruner, 1920

References

Further reading

External links

 

Acrididae
Orthoptera tribes